hr1 plus was a German, public radio station owned and operated by the Hessischer Rundfunk (HR).

References

Defunct radio stations in Germany
Radio stations established in 1998
Radio stations disestablished in 2001
1998 establishments in Germany
2001 disestablishments in Germany
Mass media in Frankfurt
Hessischer Rundfunk